Armenians in Lithuania refers to ethnic Armenians living in Lithuania.

According to the Lithuanian census of 2011 there were 1,233 Armenians in Lithuania. Armenian organizations put the number around 2,500. According to Soviet 1989 census there are 1,655 Armenians in Lithuania. The Armenians live mainly in Vilnius.

History
The settlement of Armenians in Lithuania, in the distant past of the Polish–Lithuanian Commonwealth was of an episodic nature and was due mainly to the needs of trade, although from the historical sources it is known, that Armenian school was established in 16th century Vilnius, Armenian guild in the 16th to 18th centuries Vilnius. One of the most prominent painter of the 19th century in Lithuania was Jan Rustem (Armenian: Յան Ռուստամ).

Demographics
The roots  of the Armenian community now living in Lithuania traces back to migration occurring in the 20th century. 

Community members estimated their count at 2500 in 2001.

Recent developments 
An Armenian community center was opened in year 2000. 

A Khachkar was erected in the Hill of crosses in 2001 and in the center of Kaunas in 2004. 

An Armenian church St. Vardan was opened in Vilnius in 2006. 

In 2011 Armenian Embassy in Lithuania was opened. Updates on Armenian cultural events in Lithuania can be found on twitter page of Armenian Ambassador to Lithuania.

Famous Lithuanian Armenians
Seržas Gandžumianas, a famous designer
Marat Sargsyan, a TV host and film-maker

References

See also 
Armenia-Lithuania relations

Lithuania
Ethnic groups in Lithuania